Stadtseebach is a river of Baden-Württemberg, Germany. Another name, however not any longer officially used, is Saubach. It flows into the Sulm in Erlenbach. At the end in the area of Erlenbach it is also called Weinsberger Bach.

See also
List of rivers of Baden-Württemberg

References

Rivers of Baden-Württemberg
Rivers of Germany